Justin Daniel Walton (born March 24, 1987) is a former American football center. He was drafted by the Denver Broncos in the third round of the 2010 NFL Draft and has also played for the Washington Redskins, Miami Dolphins, and New York Giants. He played college football at Baylor.

Early years
Walton attended Allen High School in Texas, where he was a first-team all-district and first-team all-county offensive lineman. He recorded 79 pancake blocks to lead District 9-5A as senior, as he helped Allen to win the bi-district championship. In his junior year, he was a second-team all-district pick after recording 59 pancake blocks. Walton was a teammate of former Arkansas quarterback Casey Dick.

Considered only a two-star recruit by Rivals.com, Walton was not listed among the top offensive line prospects in the class of 2005. However, he received 14 Division I scholarship offers and eventually picked Arizona State over Colorado State, Iowa State, SMU, and Utah.

College career
After redshirting his freshman year at Arizona State, Walton decided to transfer to his home state and enrolled at Baylor University. Due to NCAA transfer rules, he had to sit out his first year at Baylor.

Finally playing in his sophomore year, Walton started every game at center—one of three Baylor offensive linemen to do so, joining Dan Gay and James Barnard—for the Bears in 2007. He played 911 snaps, most by a Baylor offensive performer. The Bears' offensive line yielded only 21 quarterback sacks, the fewest since 1995.

In his junior year, started all 12 games at center and earned 2008 honorable mention All-Big 12 by the Associated Press. Baylor's line, which also featured Jason Smith, who was the No. 2 pick of the 2009 NFL Draft, generated 2,349 rushing yards, the most at the school since 1981, and 29 touchdowns.

Walton entered his senior year as an Outland Trophy and Rimington Trophy candidate. He again started all games for the Bears and has now 36 consecutive starts. Walton was a finalist for the 2009 Rimington Trophy, but eventually lost out to Maurkice Pouncey. However, he was named a 2009 College Football All-American by the Associated Press, the first Baylor center to do so since Aubrey Schulz in 1974.

He was invited to play in the Senior Bowl and East-West Shrine games.

Professional career

Pre-draft
Walton was rated the No. 1-rated senior center in the 2010 NFL Draft by ESPN analyst Mel Kiper Jr. He drew comparisons to Jake Grove.

Denver Broncos
Walton was selected by the Denver Broncos in the third round (80th overall) of the 2010 NFL Draft. He was the second center to be picked in the draft, after first rounder Maurkice Pouncey. Walton signed a four-year contract on June 17, 2010. On September 30, 2012, Walton suffered a dislocated ankle during a game against the Oakland Raiders, and was subsequently placed on injured reserve. On December 17, 2013, he was waived by the Denver Broncos.

Washington Redskins
Walton was claimed off waivers by the Washington Redskins on December 18, 2013.

New York Giants
Walton was signed by the New York Giants on March 12, 2014. He was released on March 2, 2015.

Miami Dolphins
Walton signed with the Miami Dolphins on March 19, 2015. On August 30, 2015, he was released by the Dolphins.

San Diego Chargers
The San Diego Chargers signed Walton on September 29, 2015.

References

External links
Baylor Bears football bio

1987 births
Living people
Sportspeople from Lawton, Oklahoma
Players of American football from Oklahoma
American football centers
Arizona State Sun Devils football players
Baylor Bears football players
Denver Broncos players
Washington Redskins players
New York Giants players
Miami Dolphins players
San Diego Chargers players
People from Allen, Texas